Ahearn or Ahearne is a surname. It descends from Echthighern mac Cennétig. Notable people with the surname include:

Blake Ahearn (born 1984), American basketball player
Bunny Ahearne (1900–1985), British ice hockey promoter
Joe Ahearne, British television director
Michael Ahearne (born 1966), academic and author
Mike Ahearn (1878–1948), American college football coach
Rick Ahearn (born 1949), American political consultant, longtime Ronald Reagan aide
T. Franklin Ahearn (1886–1962), Canadian hockey club owner and politician
Theresa Ahearn (1951–2000), Irish politician
Thomas Ahearn (1855–1938), Canadian inventor and businessman
Thomas Ahearn (Australian politician) (born 1929) Australian politician and patent attorney
William Ahearn (1858–1919), American baseball player

See also
Ahearne Cup
Ahearn Field House
Ahern
Hearn (disambiguation)
3192 A'Hearn, a minor planet

Surnames of Irish origin